Patrick Lemarié is a French auto racing driver born February 6, 1968, in Paris. He currently competes in the NASCAR Whelen Euro Series, driving the No. 5 car for Academy Motorsport in the EuroNASCAR PRO class having previously competed for FEED Vict Racing and DF1 Racing. The son of Jean Pierre Lemarié (1941–2016), he spent four years performing testing work for the British American Racing Formula One team but was never considered for a race seat due to his lack of experience. Lemarié's manager, Craig Pollock, hired him to drive for the new PK Racing Champ Car team in 2003. He scored two tenth-place finishes in the first two events but was replaced after six races for Mazda Raceway Laguna Seca expert Bryan Herta. Lemarié has also competed in the 24 Hours of Le Mans, American Le Mans series, Indy Lights, Toyota Atlantic and Formula 3000.

In 2022, he became the oldest winner in NASCAR Whelen Euro Series by winning the final round of the season at 54 years old.

Racing record

Complete International Formula 3000 results
(key) (Races in bold indicate pole position) (Races in italics indicate fastest lap)

Le Mans 24 Hours results

Complete American Le Mans Series results

Complete CART results
(key)

Complete NASCAR results

Whelen Euro Series - EuroNASCAR PRO
(key) Bold - Pole position awarded by fastest qualifying time (in Race 1) or by previous race's fastest lap (in Race 2). Italics - Fastest lap. * – Most laps led.  ^ – Most positions gained.)

References

External links
Driver DB Profile

1968 births
Living people
French racing drivers
Champ Car drivers
Atlantic Championship drivers
International Formula 3000 drivers
24 Hours of Le Mans drivers
NASCAR drivers

KV Racing Technology drivers
American Spirit Team Johansson drivers
Arena Motorsport drivers